John Egan is an Irish hurler and Gaelic footballer from County Kerry.

References
http://hoganstand.com/kerry/ArticleForm.aspx?ID=78517
http://hoganstand.com/kerry/ArticleForm.aspx?ID=96444

Kerry inter-county hurlers
St Brendan's hurlers
Ardfert Gaelic footballers
Living people
Year of birth missing (living people)